Disulfoton is an organophosphate acetylcholinesterase inhibitor used as an insecticide.  It is manufactured under the name Di-Syston by Bayer CropScience. Disulfoton in its pure form is a colorless oil but the technical product used in vegetable fields is dark and yellowish with a sulfur odor. Disulfoton is processed as a liquid into carrier granules, these granules are mixed with fertilizer and clay to be made into a spike, designed to be driven into the ground. The pesticide is absorbed over time by the roots and translocated to all parts of the plant. The pesticide acts as a cholinesterase inhibitor and gives long lasting control.

The use of the substance has been restricted by the US government. Bayer, the manufacturer, exited the US market December 31, 2009.

Synthesis 
Disulfoton is synthesized by sulfide formation of 2-ethylthioethanol + O,O-diethyl hydrogen phosphorodithioate with beta-chloroethyl thioethyl ether.

Metabolites 
Oxidation of Disulfoton happens rapidly and metabolizes disulfoton into sulfones and sulfoxides, oxidation to oxygen analogs and/or hydrolysis to produce a corresponding phosphorothionate or phosphate. Microsomal enzymes are being inhibited during the metabolism.

Mechanism of action 
Organophosphorus pesticides like Disulfoton inhibit esterase enzyme activity like choline esterase. These types of pesticides can also directly interact with the biochemical receptors of acetylcholine.

Organophosphates in general poisons mammals and insects by phosphorylating the acetylcholinesterase enzyme at nerve endings resulting in loss of function of the enzyme. This allows the accumulation of the neurotransmitter acetylcholine in cholinergic neuroeffector junctions, skeletal myoneural junctions, and autonomic ganglia. This refers to the type of receptors of acetylcholine, the muscarinic and nicotinic effects respectively. Thus organophosphates also impairs nerve impulse transmission.

Disulfoton can be absorbed via ingestion, inhalation or penetration of the skin as it can be rapidly absorbed via mucous membranes. When disulfoton is absorbed, it will be distributed via the blood circulation and undergo hydrolytic degradation. This mainly happens in the liver or kidneys but in other tissues as well. Disulfoton is excreted in different metabolites via the urine.

Toxicity 
Disulfoton is classified as a super toxic substance. The estimated oral lethal dose in humans is less than 5 mg/kg, which is analog to seven drops for a 70 kg person.

Not only oral intake, but also skin contact and inhalation are fatal because of acute toxicity. Disulfoton is also very toxic to aquatic life and forms an acute hazard with long lasting effects.

Symptoms 
Signs of disulfoton toxicity includes headaches, cyanosis, weakness, fatigue, nausea, vomiting, abdominal cramps, diarrhea, blurred vision, mental confusion, loss of muscle coordination and sialorrhea. Death can occur when respiratory arrest ensues from failure of the respiratory muscles. Other symptoms found in a patient with an unknown quantity of disulfoton were intra-alveolar bleeding, blood in the bronchus, edema of the lungs and swelling of the glomerulus.

Treatment 
The treatment of the granular form of disulfoton poisoning should be with repetitive or prolonged gastric and intestinal lavage (washing out of the body cavity). Also charcoal and a continuous intravenous infusion of pralidoxime iodide in addition to atropine sulfate.

See also
Demeton, its phosphorothioate equivalent

References

External links
Agency for Toxic Substances and Disease Registry: Disulfoton
 National Institute for Occupational Safety and Health: Disulfoton
Pubchem
Pubchem HSDB

Acetylcholinesterase inhibitors
Organophosphate insecticides
Phosphorodithioates